FableVision Studios is a media production studio located on the top floor of Boston Children's Museum in the city's Innovation District. FableVision designs and develops a wide array of educational media, including software, games and interactive activities, mobile apps, animated films, websites, and museum kiosks, as well as providing strategy and media consulting.

Founded by CEO Peter H. Reynolds in 1996, FableVision produces children's broadcast programming, educational videos, and multimedia applications. FableVision Learning's products include software (BrainCogs, Essay Express, Stationery Studio), online curriculum (Get A Clue), books (Ish, The Dot, So Few of Me), animated films (Stories That Matter, Stories That Move, The Dot, Ish), and curriculum tools (The North Star Classroom Resource Guide, North Star Musical Journey, and Off the Path Math With Tobbs).

In addition to publishing educational software, books and films, FableVision collaborates with creative partners and producers to develop animation and interactive solutions for broadcast, web, school, and museum applications.

History
FableVision was founded in 1996 by twin brothers Peter and Paul Reynolds with Gary Goldberger and John Lechner. Prior to starting FableVision, New York Times bestselling author/illustrator Peter was working for Tom Snyder Production using media, storytelling, and technology to teach kids and challenge them. Paul was working with Cosmic Blender, also using media, storytelling, and technology for adults to make workplace learning more fun. FableVision was originally located in Watertown, Massachusetts alongside Cosmic Blender.

As the company started to take shape, kindred spirits gravitated to the Watertown studio. FableVision President Gary Goldberger has been a cornerstone of the “vision" in FableVision since the beginning. Together, Peter, Paul, and Gary laid the foundation for the studio, an educational media development studio on a 200-year-long mission to move the world to a better place through story, media, and technology.

After 10 years in Watertown, FableVision Studios found its new home above the Boston Children’s Museum, appropriately located in the Innovation District. The building, now named the Yawkey Center for Children and Learning, also houses several other educational organizations, such as JumpStart and Citizen Schools.

FableVision Studios has collaborated with broadcasters, publishers, nonprofits, research groups, and museums, including PBS, The Jim Henson Company, Nick Jr., Smithsonian, MIT, and National Geographic Society to design and develop award-winning websites, games, animated films, museum kiosks, and mobile apps.

FableVision Learning
FableVision Learning is a K-12 educational media publisher providing creative learning tools, resources, and support for the classroom. FableVision Learning has a front-line relationship with over 42,000 teachers across the U.S. and around the world and makes educational software and curriculum to promote “creativity, communication, collaboration, critical thinking and compassion.”

The Reynolds Center for Teaching, Learning and Creativity
The Reynolds Center for Teaching, Learning and Creativity is a 501(c)(3) non-profit organization that encourages creativity and innovation in teaching and learning. They work with like-minded partners to develop & evaluate new media, tools, initiatives that foster and scale authentic, engaged learning. Reynolds TLC also offers workshops, retreats, and PD programs.

References

Companies based in Boston
Educational software companies